Sebastian Gatzka (born 19 May 1982 in Rotenburg an der Fulda) is a German sprinter who specializes in the 400 metres.

At the 2000 World Junior Championships Gatzka won a silver medal in 4x400 m relay with Christian Duma, Steffen Hönig and Bastian Swillims. Gatzka travelled to the 2004 Summer Olympics as a reserve team member, but did not make an Olympic start. At the 2005 European Indoor Championships he won a bronze medal in 400 m and came in fourth with the German 4x400 m relay team.

His personal best time is 45.88 seconds, achieved in July 2006 in Regensburg. He represents LG Eintracht Frankfurt and is coached by Volker Beck.

References

1982 births
Living people
People from Rotenburg an der Fulda
Sportspeople from Kassel (region)
German male sprinters